Stereotype (stylized in all caps) is the debut extended play (EP) by South Korean girl group STAYC. Distributed by Kakao Entertainment, it was released by High Up Entertainment on September 6, 2021, almost ten months after the group's debut.

Composition
Stereotype contains four songs. The title track conveys the message that people should not be judged based on their looks, and instead appreciated for the "various colors and elements that make who they are". The other tracks include "I'll Be There", which "speaks about the pain of a breakup", "Slow Down",“ a tropical house song, and "Complex", a song that "blends groovy beats with catchy melodies".

Release
On August 4, 2021, High Up Entertainment announced that STAYC would be releasing their first EP in early September. On August 15, 2021, its title was revealed to be Stereotype. The EP and the music video for its title track were released simultaneously on September 6.

Reception

In a review for NME, Carmen Chin wrote that the EP was "a project of pure aural bliss" and "STAYC doesn’t just challenge expectations of girl group music, but blazes the trail for a promising future through what has become their best release yet."

Commercial performance
Stereotype sold over 114,000 copies within one week after being released. It debuted at number 2 on the Gaon Album Chart.

Track listing  

All tracks were written by Black Eyed Pilseung and Jeon Goon, and arranged by Rado.

Notes
 All tracks are stylized in all caps.

Charts

Release history

References

2021 EPs
Korean-language EPs
STAYC albums